Sagene may refer to:

Places
Sagene, a district of the city of Oslo, Norway
Sagene Line, an abandoned line of the Oslo Tramway in Sagene in Oslo, Norway
Sagene Depot, a disused tram depot in Sagene in Oslo, Norway
Sagene Church, a church in Sagene in the city of Oslo, Norway
Sagene, Agder, a village in Arendal municipality in Agder county, Norway

Other
sagene, an old unit of length that is now among the Obsolete Russian units of measurement
sagene, an old unit of length that is now among the Obsolete Tatar units of measurement